The Queen Victoria Sea (Morye Korolevy Viktorii) is a body of water in the Arctic Ocean, stretching from northeast of Svalbard to northwest Franz Josef Land. It is obstructed by ice most of the year.

This sea is named after Queen Victoria. Russian Arctic explorer Valentin Akkuratov claimed that a branch of the Gulf Stream reached as far north as the Queen Victoria Sea.

Geography
The Queen Victoria Sea is located at 81° north longitude and 38° east latitude.  The Arctic Ocean farther north of the sea is frozen year-round. The sea stretches as far west as the Sjuøyane in Svalbard and as far east as Rudolf Island in the Franz Josef Archipelago. 

The islands of Kvitøya and Victoria Island are located at the southern limit of this Arctic sea. To the south lies the Barents Sea.

See also
 List of seas

References

External links
На линии огня (Russian)
Земля Санникова (Russian)

Marginal seas of the Arctic Ocean
Seas of Norway
Seas of Russia
Franz Josef Land
Bodies of water of Svalbard
Bodies of water of Arkhangelsk Oblast